The Order of the Yugoslav Star was the highest national order of merit awarded in Yugoslavia. It was divided into four classes. The highest class, the Yugoslav Great Star was the highest state decoration awarded in Yugoslavia. The order was mostly awarded to foreign heads of state for the development and strengthening of peace and cooperation between nations.

The Order of the Yugoslav Star was also the second highest order of merit in Serbia and Montenegro.

History
Order of the Yugoslav Star was founded by the President of Yugoslavia Josip Broz Tito on 1 February 1954 and had three Classes. Law on Decorations was amended on 1 March 1961, so from then on, the Order had four Classes:
Yugoslav Great Star — highest decoration in SFR Yugoslavia
Yugoslav Star with Sash (before 1961 Order of the Yugoslav Star, I Class) — 6th highest decoration in SFR Yugoslavia
Yugoslav Star with Golden Wreath (before 1961 Order of the Yugoslav Star, II Class) — 14th highest decoration in SFR Yugoslavia
Yugoslav Star on Cravat (before 1961 Order of the Yugoslav Star, III Class) — 24th highest decoration in SFR Yugoslavia

After the Breakup of Yugoslavia, the Federal Republic of Yugoslavia (and later Serbia and Montenegro) continued to use some of the decorations of former Yugoslavia, among them Order of the Yugoslav Star. In the Federal Republic of Yugoslavia, Order of the Yugoslav Star was the second highest order after the Order of Yugoslavia. During this time the four Classes of the order were named:
Yugoslav Great Star — 2nd highest decoration in FR Yugoslavia (after the Order of Yugoslavia)
Yugoslav Star, I Class — 7th highest decoration in FR Yugoslavia
Yugoslav Star, II Class — 20th highest decoration in FR Yugoslavia
Yugoslav Star, III Class — 31st highest decoration in FR Yugoslavia

Recipients 
The Order was usually awarded to foreign heads of state and other distinguished foreigners who visited Yugoslavia. Up to 1985, the Yugoslav Great Star was awarded 127 times of which 115 to foreigners and 12 to Yugoslav citizens. Some of the notable recipients of the Yugoslav Great Star (or Yugoslav Star, I Class before 1961) are:

Recipients of the SFRY 
 Josip Broz Tito, President of Yugoslavia – awarded on 1 February 1954
 Paul I, King of Greece – awarded on 2 June 1954 
 Haile Selassie, Emperor of Ethiopia – awarded on 21 July 1954
 Mohammed Zahir Shah, King of Afghanistan – awarded on 1 November 1960
 Hassan II, King of Morocco – awarded on 1 April 1961
 Leonid Brezhnev, Soviet leader – awarded in 1962
 Sukarno, president of Indonesia – awarded on 16 October 1963
 Elena Ceaușescu, wife of President of Romania and Deputy Prime Minister of Romania – awarded 1964
 Habib Bourguiba, President of Tunisia – awarded in 1965
 Mohammad Reza Pahlavi, Shah of Iran – awarded on 3 June 1966
 Nicolae Ceaușescu, President of Romania awarded 1966
 Norodom Sihanouk, King of Cambodia – awarded on 17 January 1968
 Jacques Chaban-Delmas, Prime Minister of France
 Elizabeth II, Queen of the United Kingdom – awarded on 19 October 1972
 Prince Philip, Duke of Edinburgh – awarded on 19 October 1972
 Soeharto, President of Indonesia – awarded on 1975
 Siti Hartinah, First Lady of Indonesia – awarded on 1975
 Ziaur Rahman, President of Bangladesh
 Olav V, King of Norway
 Harald V, Crown Prince of Norway
 Margrethe II, Queen of Denmark
 Henrik, Prince Consort of Denmark
 Carl XVI Gustaf, King of Sweden
 Urho Kekkonen, President of Finland
 Mauno Koivisto, President of Finland
 Kim Il-sung, President of North Korea
 Yumjaagiin Tsedenbal, Prime Minister of Mongolia
 Kurt Waldheim, Secretary-General of the United Nations
 Todor Zhivkov, President of Bulgaria
 Jean-Bédel Bokassa, Emperor of Central Africa
 Gaafar Nimeiry, President of the Sudan
 Edward Gierek, First Secretary of the Polish United Workers' Party
 Birendra, King of Nepal – awarded on 2 February 1974
 Jaber Al-Ahmad Al-Jaber Al-Sabah, Emir of Kuwait – awarded on 3 February 1979
 Juliana, Queen of the Netherlands – awarded on 20 August 1970
 Bernhard, Prince consort of the Netherlands – awarded on 20 August 1970
 Hussein I, King of Jordan – awarded on 11 February 1979
 Francisco da Costa Gomes, President of Portugal – awarded on 29 April 1976
 Ahmed Hassan al-Bakr, President of Iraq
 Celâl Bayar, President of Turkey

Recipients of the FRY and Serbia and Montenegro 
 Muammar al-Gaddafi, leader of Libya – awarded on 26 October 1999
 Igor Sergeyev, Marshal of the Russian Federation, Defence Minister – awarded on 23 December 1999
 Li Peng, Chairman of the Standing Committee of the National People's Congress – awarded on 12 June 2000
 Akihito, Emperor of Japan
  Ion Iliescu, President of Romania – awarded on 8 September 2004

See also
Orders, decorations, and medals of the Socialist Federal Republic of Yugoslavia
Orders, decorations, and medals of the Federal Republic of Yugoslavia

Notes

References

Yugoslav Star
Awards established in 1954
1954 establishments in Yugoslavia
Orders of chivalry awarded to heads of state, consorts and sovereign family members